Nizhneye is a rural locality (a selo) in Starodubsky District, Bryansk Oblast, Russia. The population was 447 as of 2010. There are 9 streets.

Geography 
Nizhneye is located 18 km southwest of Starodub (the district's administrative centre) by road. Istrovka is the nearest rural locality.

References 

Rural localities in Starodubsky District
Starodubsky Uyezd